The 1995–96 Cupa României was the 58th edition of Romania's most prestigious football cup competition.

The title was won by Steaua București against Gloria Bistrița.

Format
The competition is an annual knockout tournament.

First round proper matches are played on the ground of the lowest ranked team, then from the second round proper the matches are played on a neutral location.

If a match is drawn after 90 minutes, the game goes into extra time. If the match is still tied, the result is decided by penalty kicks.

From the first edition, the teams from Divizia A entered in competition in sixteen finals, rule which remained till today.

First round proper

|colspan=3 style="background-color:#97DEFF;"|16 December 1995

|}

Second round proper

|colspan=3 style="background-color:#97DEFF;"|20 December 1995

|}

Quarter-finals

|colspan=3 style="background-color:#97DEFF;"|13 March 1996

|}

Semi-finals

|colspan=3 style="background-color:#97DEFF;"|3 April 1996

|}

Final

References

External links
 romaniansoccer.ro
 Official site
 The Romanian Cup on the FRF's official site

Cupa României seasons
Cupa Romaniei
Romania